The Laz people in Turkey (Turkish: Türkiye Lazları, Laz: ლაზეფე თურქონაშე Lazepe Turkonaşe) are Turkish citizens of Laz descent, an ethnic group native to the eastern Black Sea coast of Turkey and southwestern Georgia.

Terminology 
The Turkish public sometimes uses the name "Laz" generally to refer to all inhabitants of Turkey's Black Sea provinces east of Samsun, and the word is often associated with certain social stereotypes.  However, the Laz themselves are increasingly keen to differentiate themselves from other inhabitants of these regions. Also, the non-Laz does not want to be called "Laz", preferring to be called Karadenizli  ("from the Black Sea region"). The Laz language (Lazca in Turkish) is a Kartvelian language, also known as South Caucasian, unrelated to the Black Sea dialect of Turkish language.

References 

Ethnic groups in Turkey